Martin Kneser (21 January 1928 – 16 February 2004) was a German mathematician. His father Hellmuth Kneser and grandfather Adolf Kneser were also mathematicians.

He obtained his PhD in 1950 from Humboldt University of Berlin with the dissertation: Über den Rand von Parallelkörpern. His advisor was Erhard Schmidt.

His name has been given to Kneser graphs which he studied in 1955. He also gave a simplified proof of the Fundamental theorem of algebra.

Kneser was an Invited Speaker of the ICM in 1962 at Stockholm. His main publications were on quadratic forms and algebraic groups.

See also
Approximation in algebraic groups
Betke–Kneser theorem
Kneser–Tits conjecture
Kneser's theorem (combinatorics)
Kneser graphs

References

 Martin Kneser’s Work on Quadratic Forms and Algebraic Groups

1928 births
2004 deaths
Number theorists
20th-century German mathematicians
21st-century German mathematicians